A sandbag is an obstruction device commonly used in flood control and temporary military fortifications.

Sandbag may also refer to:
 A sand-filled punching bag or weight bag.
 A bean bag with very fine-particled fillings like sand, grounded grain/husk or polyvinyl pellets.
Sandbag (Smash Bros.), a character from Super Smash Bros. Melee.
Sandbag (non-profit organisation), a campaign group for reduction of carbon emissions.
 , the term used for deceptively hiding the strength, skill or difficulty of something or someone early in an engagement.
 Sandbag in the sense of bullying or ganging up.

See also
The Sandbaggers, a British TV series from the late 1970s